Gordon Patrick Quinn ( 11 May 1932 – February 2018) was an English retired professional footballer who played as an inside forward in the Football League for Queens Park Rangers and Plymouth Argyle. He later served as chief scout at Brentford.

Career statistics

References 

2018 deaths
English footballers
English Football League players
1932 births
Footballers from Hammersmith
Association football inside forwards
Queens Park Rangers F.C. players
Plymouth Argyle F.C. players
Tunbridge Wells F.C. players
Brentford F.C. non-playing staff
Tonbridge Angels F.C. players
Cambridge United F.C. players
Ebbsfleet United F.C. players
Dover F.C. players
Margate F.C. players
Southern Football League players